The 1947 Jacksonville State Gamecocks football team represented Jacksonville State Teachers College (now known as Jacksonville State University) as a member of the Alabama Intercollegiate Conference (AIC) during the 1947 college football season. Led by second-year head coach Don Salls, the Gamecocks compiled an overall record of 9–0 with a mark of 3–0 in conference play, and finished as AIC champion.

Schedule

References

Jacksonville State
Jacksonville State Gamecocks football seasons
Alabama Collegiate Conference football champion seasons
College football undefeated seasons
Jacksonville State Gamecocks football